Great Moments with Mr. Lincoln is a stage show featuring an Audio-Animatronic representation of U.S. President Abraham Lincoln, best known for being presented at Disneyland since 1965. It was originally showcased as the prime feature of the State of Illinois Pavilion at the 1964 New York World's Fair. One year after its debut at the World's Fair, the show opened at Disneyland, where it has undergone several changes and periods of hiatus over the years. Today Great Moments with Mr. Lincoln is an element of the Disneyland attraction The Disneyland Story presenting Great Moments with Mr. Lincoln, which opened in 2009.

Walt Disney originally conceived of a show that would pay tribute to all U.S. Presidents as part of a proposed extension of Main Street, U.S.A. in the 1950s. However, the technology at the time would not permit a show on the scale Disney wanted, and the Main Street extension proposal was abandoned (the presidential tribute was later built as The Hall of Presidents at Walt Disney World's Magic Kingdom). Disney's Imagineers opted to focus instead on creating a tribute to Lincoln, Disney's boyhood hero. In 1962, Robert Moses visited Disney seeking ideas for attractions for the upcoming World's Fair. Moses was intrigued by a prototype of the Audio-Animatronic Lincoln, and Disney agreed to build it. The show premiered at the World's Fair on April 22, 1964, and consisted of a pre-show highlighting the state of Illinois, followed by a theater presentation in which the Audio-Animatronic Lincoln gave a speech that included excerpts from multiple speeches actually delivered by Lincoln. It ran for the entirety of both of the World's Fair's 6-month seasons, and closed on October 17, 1965.

During the second season of the World's Fair, a duplicate version of the show opened at Disneyland on July 18, 1965. The show ran until 1973, when it was replaced by The Walt Disney Story, a biographical film on Walt Disney. Disneyland was criticized for this move, and in 1975 the show was replaced by The Walt Disney Story Featuring Great Moments with Mr. Lincoln, a hybrid of the two shows. The 1975 version of The Walt Disney Story Featuring Great Moments with Mr. Lincoln underwent several minor changes over the years, and closed in 2000. In 2001, it was replaced with an attraction of the same name, but which had more of a focus on the American Civil War. This version closed in 2004, and from 2005 to 2009 the attraction was replaced with Disneyland: The First 50 Magical Years, a tribute to Disneyland's 50th anniversary which included exhibits on Disneyland in the pre-show and post-show areas and a film narrated by Steve Martin.

The present-day attraction features a pre-show consisting of exhibits on the history of Disneyland. The main show features a short biographical film on Lincoln and an updated version of the original show.

World's Fair attraction
The original version of the attraction opened with the rest of the New York World's Fair on April 22, 1964, as Great Moments with Mr. Lincoln, inside the State of Illinois Pavilion. The overall theme of the show dealt with inspiration, justice, and the meaning of the United States Constitution.

The pre-show consisted of a film with a depiction of paintings representing Illinois and a soundtrack featuring the Illinois state song with narration by Royal Dano and Disney Legends recipient Paul Frees. Guests then entered the main theater where the curtains opened to reveal an audio-animatronic figure of Abraham Lincoln sitting in a chair. He then stood up and gave a measured, dignified address, lasting 5 minutes and 15 seconds, that was actually a combination of several of his speeches. Royal Dano was also the voice of Lincoln. The show concluded with the curtains opening further to reveal the Rotunda of the United States Capitol Building. An abstract image of the American Flag was revealed behind the Rotunda as a backdrop, and a rendition of "The Battle Hymn of the Republic" could be heard.

Lincoln's face was created by sculptor Blaine Gibson (also a Disney Legend) using a copy of a life mask of Lincoln made by Leonard Volk in Chicago in 1860. Lincoln's speech was compiled by James Algar (yet another Disney Legend), who was also the main writer and producer of the show. As performed, the speech ran as follows:

The attraction closed at the end of the Fair's first season on October 18, 1964, and reopened for the second and final season from April 21, 1965, to October 17, 1965. At the end of the Fair, the State of Illinois Pavilion was completely demolished. Only valuable cultural artifacts and collections were returned to Illinois or elsewhere around the world. The original audio-animatronic figure of Lincoln was believed to have been lost. For many years, all that remained of the original version of the attraction were the memories of those who saw it, photographs, audio tapes and film recordings. Years later, it was discovered that the original Lincoln figure had been packed in a crate, shipped back to California and mysteriously forgotten for decades. It is currently on display at the Walt Disney: One Man's Dream attraction at the Hollywood Studios.

In 2009, a CD box set of Walt Disney's contributions to the World's Fair was produced, with the second disc comprising music and dialog from, and Disney's own introduction to, Great Moments.

Disneyland attraction

The attraction has appeared in many forms over the years at Disneyland in Anaheim, California, United States.

Original version (1965–1972)
The first Disneyland version of Great Moments with Mr. Lincoln – named after the World's Fair attraction – opened on July 18, 1965, in honor of the official 10th anniversary of the park, in the new Opera House on Main Street, USA. The show in the main theater with Mr. Lincoln was a duplicate of the World's Fair attraction. The exterior and interiors of the building were given a new theme using Abraham Lincoln and Walt Disney exhibits, displays and films as the attraction was presented by Lincoln Savings and Loan Association, not the state of Illinois. It did not require an "A" through "E" attraction admission ticket. This version of the attraction ended January 1, 1973, along with the sponsorship by Lincoln Savings.

The Walt Disney Story (1973–1975)
On April 8, 1973, a different attraction named The Walt Disney Story opened in the Opera House. While the exterior remained the same with the exception of new signage, the interior was redesigned so the exhibits could reflect the history of Walt Disney, The Walt Disney Company, and Disneyland. The main theater looked the same, but the audio-animatronic Abraham Lincoln and other props and set pieces were either removed or remained in place covered by the projection screen that was added to show the tribute film to Walt Disney. The film, which lasted 23 minutes, stitched together archival film and audio footage that appeared to be an autobiography of Walt Disney. A similar version of this attraction also appeared in the Magic Kingdom at the Walt Disney World Resort From April 15, 1973 until October 5, 1992.

The Walt Disney Story Featuring Great Moments with Mr. Lincoln (1975–2000)
While The Walt Disney Story was a fitting tribute to Walt Disney, who had died on December 15, 1966, the show received a great deal of public criticism by those who were upset by the removal of Great Moments with Mr. Lincoln. The attraction closed in early 1975 and reopened on June 12, 1975, as The Walt Disney Story Featuring Great Moments with Mr. Lincoln. The motion picture screen in the main theater was removed and the theater was restored to its original form as it had been during Great Moments with Mr. Lincoln, including the show itself. However, the entrance, pre-show, post-show, and exit no longer featured exhibits on Abraham Lincoln, but rather Walt Disney. A new, revised film about Walt Disney became the sole pre-show production and the previous 23-minute feature film was eliminated. After the preshow, guests entered the main theater to see the original show which remained the same, but the speech Abraham Lincoln gave was edited; some of the words were adapted from the speech Abraham Lincoln gave in Walt Disney World's Hall of Presidents.

The attraction was updated in 1984 with a new version of the pre-show film on Walt Disney and revisions to the Great Moments with Mr. Lincoln show in the main theater. A new audio-animatronic Abraham Lincoln was created with enhanced movements and facial expressions, new skin, a new costume, and the ability to hold a piece of paper in his hand for his speech. The props and set pieces on the stage were also redressed. The original 1964 World's Fair audio recordings were still used for the narration and speech by Mr. Lincoln, however portions of Lincoln's speech were deleted. Two new songs, "Golden Dream" and "Two Brothers," were added to the production. Both songs came from The American Adventure, a show inside the American Pavilion in Epcot at the Walt Disney World Resort. "Golden Dream" replaced "Battle Hymn of the Republic" as the song in the finale. This version closed in 2000.

The Walt Disney Story Featuring Great Moments with Mr. Lincoln: The Journey to Gettysburg (2001–2004)
During refurbishment, the Paul Frees and Royal Dano recordings were removed, and both were eventually replaced by Corey Burton, who voiced Mathew Brady, and Warren Burton who provided the voice of Lincoln. The set was also redone, the background curtains as well as the replica of the US Capitol's rotunda were completely removed. The chair where Lincoln sat was replaced with a small wooden chair. The small columns behind the chair were also removed and replaced with plants and flowers. The big columns from the previous versions of the show were left intact. The Lincoln figure was given an upgrade; its beard was lengthened to match Lincoln's age. It was also given a pair of eyeglasses, as well as a small paper. The main theater was given a minor refurbishment, both sides featuring portraits of Civil War soldiers. Finally, on July 17, 2001, the attraction re-opened, but it was drastically changed to focus on the American Civil War, although it still retained the name The Walt Disney Story Featuring Great Moments with Mr. Lincoln. In the pre-show, guests were introduced to American Civil War photographer Mathew Brady and they assumed the role of a fictitious Union soldier named John Cunningham. They then entered the main theater where they wore special headphones with binaural sound technology. In the show, Cunningham met Brady in his photo studio, received a haircut, went back to battle and was eventually wounded. He then met President Abraham Lincoln and attended the Gettysburg Address in person. At this point, the curtains opened to reveal Lincoln standing on the stage to deliver the address. As Lincoln gave the address, the background behind him changed from a normal day to a sky at dawn, closing the show was a rendition of the Battle Hymn of the Republic. As the music was played the background changed to form the American Flag. As Lincoln sat down in his chair, a painting of the statue located at the Lincoln Memorial covered the night sky. At this point, the curtains began to descend and the 12-minute program ended.

Disneyland: The First 50 Magical Years (2005–2009)

The attraction closed temporarily on February 20, 2005, to make room for Disneyland: The First 50 Magical Years. This show had a series of exhibits and a main theater film presented by Steve Martin and an animated Donald Duck. It was part of Disneyland's Happiest Homecoming on Earth 50th anniversary celebration that lasted from May 5, 2005, to September 30, 2006. Disneyland: The First 50 Magical Years continued until March 15, 2009.

A new room-size model of Disneyland on opening day in 1955 was also added in the lobby.

The Disneyland Story presenting Great Moments with Mr. Lincoln (2009–present)
Mr. Lincoln returned in a new attraction called The Disneyland Story presenting Great Moments with Mr. Lincoln on December 18, 2009. The previous hydraulic-based audio-animatronic figure was replaced by an electronic audio-animatronic figure, which Disney Imagineers say greatly extends Lincoln's emotive capabilities. The new show features an abridged version of his autobiography, the first two sentences from his Gettysburg Address, and the song "Two Brothers" (from Epcot's American Adventure pavilion) following the news about the civil war. In the final act, the audio-animatronic Lincoln stands to perform portions of the speech from the original attraction, in which the late Royal Dano once more provides the voice of Lincoln. The script is the same that was used from 1984 to 2001. However, Dano's voice is from a newly discovered recording that is cleaner than the original performance. Also, the song "Golden Dream" is played as guests exit the attraction. As well, the recording of the song "America the Beautiful" from the Circle-Vision 360° film of the same name, opens the show. And on the end of the show, they added the song the "Battle Hymn of the Republic".

The United States Capitol model, previously displayed as the main lobby exhibit, returned and the prior model of Disneyland on opening day was moved into a tilted up position in a large display case.

In April 2022, a bust and portrait of Frederick Douglass was installed in the lobby of the Main Street Opera House. On February 1, 2023, A new pre-show video, produced in collaboration with National Geographic, debuted, telling the story of the historic relationship between Frederick Douglass and Abraham Lincoln. The new video is narrated by Robin Roberts, and includes testimonials from Douglass’ third great-grandson Kenneth B. Morris, Jr., and Dr. John Stauffer.

Development of the attraction
Walt Disney was always fascinated with the life of Abraham Lincoln. He even recited Lincoln's Gettysburg Address to his elementary class as a small boy. As Disneyland became more prosperous, Walt proposed an expansion of Main Street, U.S.A. in 1957 to be called Liberty Street. It was to be a look back at Colonial-era America. The centerpiece attraction would have been The Hall of Presidents, a stage presentation featuring figures of every single U.S. President, which would later be built at the Magic Kingdom in Walt Disney World. Walt wanted all the figures to move, but limitations of the audio-animatronics technology of the era made it impossible. After Liberty Street was abandoned, the Imagineers concentrated their efforts on one president: Mr. Lincoln.

In April 1962, Robert Moses approached Walt Disney about contributing attractions to the pavilions of the 1964 New York World's Fair. Walt took Moses around the studio, showing him the new technology his Imagineers were working on. Nothing really sparked Moses' interest. Walt then showed Moses a prototype electronic figure of Lincoln. Moses was astonished at the possibilities and told Walt that he had to have this figure at the Fair. Despite knowing that the figure was years from completion, Walt told Moses it would be ready. Moses then sought the State of Illinois as a sponsor to have Mr. Lincoln as the featured attraction at their pavilion.

Great Moments with Mr. Lincoln performed very well and became one of the big draws to the Fair. It was the first human audio-animatronics figure ever attempted by Walt Disney. In 2009, the attraction was again used to showcase the latest technology when it became the first attraction to use a human autonomatronics figure.

In popular culture
Ray Bradbury's 1969 short story "Downwind from Gettysburg" was inspired by Great Moments with Mr. Lincoln. 
The band Negativland used a modified version of the speech from the attraction in the song "God Bull" on their album No Business.
In the 101 Dalmatians: The Series episode "Cruella World" the Great Moments with Cruella Devil attraction in Cruella World is a homage to Great Moments with Mr. Lincoln. 
In the Clone High episode "A Room of One's Clone: The Pie of the Storm", the teenaged clone of Abraham Lincoln seeks advice from a "robomatronic" Lincoln in a theme park attraction that also mashes in elements of Disneyland's Enchanted Tiki Room show and the Pirates of the Caribbean ride. This Lincoln concludes his long speech encouraging people to "try the churros".
The Modern Family episode "Disneyland" closes with Jay Pritchett (Ed O'Neill) and his family sitting together watching Great Moments with Mr. Lincoln, after a long day of their family trip to Disneyland. Jay reflects that watching the show with his kids when they were young inspired him to stay with his then-wife, DeDe, for the sake of his children. After which, the conversation is interrupted by an off-screen request from Jay's now-wife, Gloria (Sofía Vergara), to join her in their backyard hot tub, he smiles and states that "the universe rewarded me".
An August 16, 2013 the Pearls Before Swine comic strip mentioned the attraction in Rat's "Beerland" themepark. Rat's version of the attraction contained Lincoln sitting drunk at a table trying to hit on women, unsuccessfully. The "Beerland" series also contained more jabs at Disneyland such as a profane version of It's a Small World.
In the Mickey Mouse episode "Potatoland", Mickey and Donald build a theme park called Potatoland to fulfill Goofy's lifelong dream to go to the park, even though it never existed. One of the attractions featured was a low-budget potato-themed version of Great Moments with Mr. Lincoln with a giant potato in a stovepipe hat and beard malfunctioning, leaving Donald to lift the potato and bring it to life, only for the potato to explode when Mickey finds that it is unplugged.
In the Futurama episode "Insane in the Mainframe", there is a robotic Lincoln, based on Great Moments with Mr. Lincoln, in the insane asylum that has 200 split personalities that are all some form of Lincoln.

Notes

See also
The Hall of Presidents, an audio-animatronic attraction/show in Walt Disney World's Magic Kingdom featuring all Presidents of the United States, including Abraham Lincoln

References

Sources

External links

Walt Disney Parks and Resorts attractions
Disneyland
Abraham Lincoln in art
1964 New York World's Fair
Main Street, U.S.A.
Audio-Animatronic attractions
Monuments and memorials to Abraham Lincoln in the United States